"Celebration" is a song by German Eurodance band Fun Factory, released in August 1995 as the second single from their second album, Fun-Tastic (1995). It is sung by Marie-Anett Mey and the rap is performed by Smooth T (a.k.a. Toni Cottura). A sizeable hit in Europe, it peaked at number 10 in Spain, number 12 in Germany and number 19 in France. Outside Europe, the single reached number nine on the RPM Dance/Urban chart in Canada and number 88 on the Billboard Hot 100 in the US. A music video was produced to promote the single, directed by Marcus Adams.

Critical reception
Larry Flick from Billboard wrote, "Speaking of musical calls for peace and unity, this red-hot Euro-dance act drops its standard rapid pace down to a per-cussive pop/reggae groove for this engaging plea for racial harmony. The result is the act's most appealing single to date. Do not be surprised if this is also Fun Factory's biggest hit, too. You are likely to be humming the chorus for hours after the first time you hear it."

Track listing
 CD single, Germany (1995)
"Celebration" (Radio Party Rap) – 3:26
"Celebration" (Radio Party Vocal) – 4:03

 CD maxi, UK & Europe (1995)
"Celebration" (Radio Party Vocal) – 4:03
"Celebration" (Radio Party Rap) – 3:26
"Celebration" (Slam Rap Extended) – 4:28
"Celebration" (Mousse T's Back To The Old School) – 4:32
"Celebration" (Black Zone Remix) – 5:09

 CD maxi, Japan (1996)
"Celebration" (Radio Party Rap) – 3:29
"Celebration" (Radio Party Vocal) – 4:05
"Celebration" (Slam Rap Extended) – 4:30
"Celebration" (Black Zone Remix) – 5:06

Charts

Weekly charts

Year-end charts

References

1995 singles
1995 songs
Fun Factory (band) songs
English-language German songs
Songs written by Bülent Aris
Songs written by Toni Cottura